Luis Jesús Rioja González (born 16 October 1993) is a Spanish footballer who plays for Deportivo Alavés as a left winger.

Club career
Rioja was born in Las Cabezas de San Juan, Seville, Andalusia, and was a CD Cabecense youth graduate. He made his senior debut on 2 September 2012, playing the last 22 minutes of a 2–0 Tercera División home win against Cádiz CF B.

Rioja scored his first senior goal on 18 November 2012, in a 4–0 home routing of Arcos CF, and finished the campaign with four goals in 35 appearances. On 27 June of the following year, he signed a three-year deal with Real Madrid and was assigned to the C-team in Segunda División B.

On 27 July 2014 Rioja joined another reserve team, Celta de Vigo B in the third division. On 4 January 2017, he moved to fellow league team Marbella FC.

On 23 July 2018, Rioja agreed to a two-year contract with Segunda División side UD Almería. He made his professional debut on 17 August, starting in a 0–1 away loss against Cádiz CF.

Rioja scored his first professional goal on 26 August 2018, netting the opener in a 1–1 home draw against CD Tenerife. He was regular starter for the club during the campaign, contributing with four goals in 39 appearances.

On 1 July 2019, Rioja signed a four-year deal with La Liga side Deportivo Alavés, as the club activated his release clause. He made his debut in the category on 18 August, starting in a 1–0 home defeat of Levante UD.

Career statistics

Club

References

External links

1993 births
Living people
People from Bajo Guadalquivir
Sportspeople from the Province of Seville
Spanish footballers
Footballers from Andalusia
Association football wingers
La Liga players
Segunda División players
Segunda División B players
Tercera División players
Real Madrid C footballers
Celta de Vigo B players
Marbella FC players
UD Almería players
Deportivo Alavés players